Freda Linde (12 December 1915 – 7 March 2013 ) was a South African children's writer and translator. She wrote predominantly in Afrikaans. She has translated over 150 children's books into Afrikaans, French and German. She received the C.P. Hoogenhout Award in 1964.

Life
Born in Swellendam, she worked as journalist and editor until 1960. From 1960 to 1963 she was editor at HAUM Publishers, and from 1964 to 1971 editor in charge of children's literature at John Malherbe publishers. She retired to write full-time in 1972.

References

External links
 Freda Linde

1915 births
2013 deaths
South African children's writers
South African women children's writers
20th-century South African women writers
Afrikaans-language writers
Translators to Afrikaans
Translators to French
Translators to German
20th-century translators
Alumni of Hoërskool Jan van Riebeeck